Casecnan Irrigation and Hydroelectric Plant is a dam diverting water from the Casecnan and Taan Rivers to the Pantabangan Reservoir through a  long tunnel located near Pantabangan and Muñoz in Nueva Ecija province of the Philippines. The multi-purpose dam provides water for irrigation and hydroelectric power generation while its reservoir affords flood control. It was considered one of the most expensive hydroelectric plants built in the country, being next only to San Roque Dam.

The Casecnan Irrigation and Power Generation Project is also located in Rizal, Nueva Ecija. The P6.75-B Project provides irrigation to 26,920 hectares of new farms in the Science City of  Munoz, Talugtog, Guimba, Cuyapo, and Nampicuan, all of Nueva Ecija. It generates 150 megawatts of power for the Luzon grid that will supply cheap electricity to millions of people in Luzon including Metro Manila.

History
In August 1987, former President Corazon Aquino signed Executive Order 136, which provides for the establishment of a Watershed Forest Reserve out of the Casecnan River. By May 1993, former President Fidel Ramos sought out investors to fund the Casecnan Phased Transbasin Project. It became one of the flagship programs of the Ramos government and by 1995, the Casecnan Project got approved for construction. In September 2001, former President Gloria Macapagal Arroyo finally opened the diversion tunnel after two years after the Phase I of the Casecnan project was done. In 2012, the Aquino government approved the construction of the second phase of the Casecnan project.

Power generation
When the Ramos government approved the start of the Casecnan project, the constructed power plant was planned to have produced 150 megawatts. However, it only produced 140 megawatts after the power plant began operation.

Irrigation
The Aquino government laid seven billion pesos to further enlarge the irrigation capacity of Casecnan which was planned to irrigate an additional  of land in Nueva Ecija and another  in Pampanga by its completion in 2016.

See also

 Casecnan Protected Landscape

References

External links

Casecnan Irrigation and Power Generation Project

Dams in the Philippines
Hydroelectric power plants in the Philippines
Dams completed in 2002
2002 establishments in the Philippines
Buildings and structures in Nueva Ecija